Dynamos may mean:

The plural of dynamo
An association football club:
Dynamos F.C. (South Africa), a South African association football club
Dynamos F.C., a Zimbabwean association football club
Lusaka Dynamos F.C., a Zambian association football club
Power Dynamos F.C., a Zambian association football club
Houston Dynamos, a defunct association football club based in Houston, Texas that was a member of the Lone Star Soccer Alliance.